Takamitsu Yoshino (吉野 峻光, born April 24, 1989) is a Japanese football player.

Club statistics
Updated to 23 February 2016.

References

External links

1989 births
Living people
Kokushikan University alumni
Association football people from Kyoto Prefecture
Japanese footballers
J1 League players
J2 League players
Cerezo Osaka players
Ventforet Kofu players
Association football midfielders